The following is a list of South Korean film directors:

A 
 Ahn Byeong-ki
 Ahn Gooc-jin
 Ahn Hae-ryong
 Ahn Pan-seok

B 
 Bae Chang-ho
 Bae Yong-Kyun
 Baik / Baek Jong-yul
 Bang Eun-jin
 Beak Woon-hak / Baek Woon-hak
 Bong Joon-ho
 Bong Man-dae
 Byun Hyuk
 Byun Jang-ho
 Byun Young-joo

C 
 Chang / Yoon Hong-seung
 Chang Yoon-hyun 
 Cho Chang-ho
 David Cho
 Cho Geun-hyun
 Cho Jung-rae
 Cho Ui-seok
 Choi Dong-hoon
 Choi Ha-won
 Choi Ho
 Choi Jin-sung
 Choi Kook-hee
 Choo Chang-min
 Chung Ji-young
 Peter Chung

E 
 E J-yong / Lee Jae-yong

H 
 Ha Gil-jong
 Hah Myung-joong
 Han Jae-rim
 Han Jun-hee
 Hong Sang-soo
 Huh Jung
 Hur Jin-ho
 Hwang Dong-hyuk
 Hwang In-ho

I 
 Im Kwon-taek
 Im Sang-soo

J 
 Jang Cheol-soo
 Jang Hang-jun
 Jang Hoon
 Jang Hyun-soo
 Jang Jae-hyun
 Jang Jin
 Jang Joon-hwan
 Jang Kun-jae
 Jang Sun-woo
 Jeon Kyu-hwan
 Jeon Soo-il
 Jeong Chang-hwa
 Jeong Gi-hun
 Jeong Jae-eun
 Jeong Yeon-shik
 Jeong Yoon-cheol
 Jin Mo-young
 Jo Jin-kyu
 Joh Keun-shik
 Juhn Jai-hong
 Jung Ji-woo
 Jung Jin-woo
 July Jung
 Jung Sung-il  
 Jung Yoon-suk
 Jung Young-bae

K 
 Ku Hye Sun
 Kang Dae-ha
 Kang Hyeong-cheol
 Kang Je-gyu
 Kang Jin-a
 Kang Woo-suk
 Young Man Kang
 Kim Byung-woo
 Kim Cheong-gi
 Kim Dae-seung
 Kim Dae-woo
 Kim Dong-won (1955-)
 Kim Dong-won (1962-)
 Gina Kim
 Kim Hak-soon
 Kim Han-min
 Kim Ho-sun
 Kim Hyun-seok
 Jason Kim (Kim Ju-hwan)
 Kim Jee-woon
 Kim Jho Kwang-soo
 Kim Jin-kyu
 Kim Jong-kwan
 Kim Jung-kwon
 Kim Ki-duk (1934-)
 Kim Ki-duk (1960-)
 Kim Ki-young
 Kim Kih-hoon
 Kim Kwang-sik
 Kim Moon-saeng
 Kim Myeong-joon
 Kim Sang-jin
 Kim Sang-man
 Kim Seong-hun
 Kim Soo-yong
 Kim Sung-hoon
 Kim Sung-su
 Kim Tae-kyun
 Kim Tae-yong (1969-)
 Kim Tae-yong (1987-)
 Kim Ui-seok
 Kim Yong-hwa
 Kim Yoo-jin
 Kim Young-tak
 Kong Su-chang
 Koo Kyo-hwan
 Kwak Jae-yong
 Kwak Ji-kyoon
 Kwak Kyung-taek
 Kwon Hyung-jin

L 
 Lee Chang-dong
 Lee Cheol-ha
 Lee Don-ku
 Lee Dong-eun
 Lee Doo-yong
 Lee Eun
 Lee Gae-byok
 Lee Hae-young
 Lee Han
 Lee Ho-jae
 Lee Hwan-kyung
 Lee Hyun-seung
 Lee Hyung-min
 Lee Jae-kyoo
 Lee Jang-ho
 Lee Jeong-beom
 Lee Jeong-hyang
 John H. Lee / Lee Jae-han
 Lee Joon-ik
 Lee Ju-hyoung
 Lee Jung-gook
 Lee Kwang-hoon
 Lee Kwang-kuk
 Lee Kwang-mo
 Lee Kwon
 Lee Kyoung-mi
 Lee Il-hyung
 Lee Man-hee
 Lee Myung-se
 Lee Sang-woo
 Lee Seok-hoon
 Lee Su-jin
 Lee Sung-gang
 Lee Won-suk
 Lee Yong-ju
 Lee Yong-min
 Lee Yoon-ki
 Leesong Hee-il
 Lim Dae-hyung

M 
 Min Kyu-dong
 Min Joon-ki
 Mun Che-yong

N 
 Na Hong-jin
 Na Hyun
 Na Woon-gyu
 Nam Gi-nam
 No Zin-soo

O 
 O Muel

P 
 Park Chan-ok
 Park Chan-wook
 Park Chul-soo
 Park Hee-gon
 Park Hee-jun
 Park Heung-sik ( 1962)
 Park Heung-sik ( 1965)
 Park Hoon-jung
 Park Jong-won
 Park Jung-bum
 Park Jung-woo
 Park Kwang-chun
 Park Kwang-hyun
 Park Kwang-su
 Park Suk-young

R 
 Roh Deok
 Roh Gyeong-tae
 Ryoo Seung-wan
 Ryu Jang-ha

S 
 Seok Rae-myeong
 Shim Hyung-rae
 Shim Sung-bo
 Shin Jai-ho
 Shin Sang-ok
 Shin Seong-il
 Shin Su-won
 Shin Yeon-shick
 Song Hae-sung
 Song Hyun-wook
 Song Il-gon

U 
 Um Tae-hwa

W 
 Won Shin-yun
 Won Tae-hee
 Woo Min-ho
 Woo Moon-gi

Y 
 Yang Ik-june
 Yang Woo-suk
 Yang Yun-ho
 Yim Pil-sung
 Yim Soon-rye
 Yoo Ha
 Yoo Ji-tae
 Yoon Ga-eun
 Yoon Je-kyoon
 Yoon Jong-bin
 Yoon Jong-chan
 Yoon Sam-yook
 Yoon Seok-ho
 Yoon Sung-hyun
 Yu Hyun-mok

See also

 Cinema of Korea
 List of highest-grossing films in South Korea

External links 
  List of Korean film directors at kmdb
  List of South Korean film directors Empas people DB
  List of Korean film directors from Naver Movie DB.

Directors
Film directors
Korea, South